St. Michel–Mavic–Auber93 is a UCI Continental cycling team based in France. The team is managed by Stephane Javalet with the help of Stéphan Gaudry.

The team was founded in 1994 as Aubervilliers 93–Peugeot, a name they had until 1997 when they turned into BigMat–Auber 93. The team has participated in the Tour de France in 1996, 1997, 1998, 1999 and 2001. In 2004 the name changed to Auber 93, reverting to the current name in 2010. In 2015, BigMat once again stopped sponsoring the team.

Team roster

Major wins 

1996
Stage 6 Grand Prix du Midi Libre, Gilles Talmant
Stage 4 Tour de France, Cyril Saugrain
1997
Stage 4 Circuito Montañés, Anthony Morin
1998
Stage 5 Volta ao Algarve, Guillaume Auger
Stage 4 Tour de Normandie, Thierry Gouvenou
Paris–Camembert, Pascal Lino
Stages 3 & 8 Prudential Tour, Jay Sweet
Stage 4 Tour du Limousin, Philippe Bordenave
Stage 3 Tour de l'Avenir, Jay Sweet
Commonwealth Games, Road Race, Jay Sweet
1999
Stage 3a Tour Méditerranéen, Guillaume Auger
Stage 3 Tour de Normandie, Jay Sweet
Stage 2a Tour de l'Oise, Jay Sweet
Stage 6 Tour de l'Avenir, Alexandre Chouffe
2000
, Road Race Championships, Christophe Capelle
Stage 3 Tour Down Under, Stéphane Bergès
Stage 2a Tour Méditerranéen, Jeremy Hunt
Stage 1 Sea Otter Classic, Jeremy Hunt
Overall Tour de Normandie, Ludovic Auger
Stage 2, Jay Sweet
Stage 1 Settimana Ciclistica Lombarda, Carlos Da Cruz
GP Stad Vilvoorde, Guillaume Auger
Stage 4 Tour de l'Ain, Denis Leproux
Stage 2b Circuit Franco-Belge, Jay Sweet
Stage 9 Herald Sun Tour, Jeremy Hunt
2001
 Great Britain, Road Race Championships, Jeremy Hunt
Stage 1 & 2 International Tour of Rhodes, Jay Sweet
Stage 7 Circuito Montañés, Jay Sweet
Mi-Août 4, Alexei Sivakov
Stage 2b Tour de l'Ain, Jay Sweet
Prix de la Ville de Soissons, Benjamin Levecot
Overall Ster Elektrotoer, Xavier Jan
Stage 4 Circuit Franco-Belge, Jeremy Hunt
2002
Grand Prix d'Ouverture La Marseillaise, Xavier Jan
Stage 1 Circuit de la Sarthe, Christophe Capelle
Mi-Août 1, Nicolas Liboreau
GP Ouest–France, Jeremy Hunt
2003
Circuit des Mines, Guillaume Auger
Stage 1 Critérium du Dauphiné Libéré, Plamen Stoyanov
Mi-Août 4, Yannick Talabardon
Stage 2a Tour de la Somme, Guillaume Auger
2004
Stage 1 Tour de Normandie, Yannick Talabardon
Tour du Jura, Yannick Talabardon
Mi-Août 2, Yannick Talabardon
2005
Bordeaux–Saintes, John Nilsson
Grand Prix de la ville de Nogent-sur-Oise, Tristan Valentin
Tro-Bro Léon, Tristan Valentin
Paris–Mantes-en-Yvelines, Maxime Méderel
Stage 4 Tour de Gironde, Saïd Haddou
Stage 1 Paris–Corrèze, William Bonnet
2006
Les Monts Luberon, Rene Mandri
Stage 7 Tour de Normandie, Maxime Méderel
Grand Prix de Villers-Cotterêts, Émilien-Benoît Bergès
Stage 1 Tour du Poitou-Charentes, Saïd Haddou
2007
Tour du Finistère, Niels Brouzes
Paris–Mantes-en-Yvelines, Niels Brouzes
Tour du Jura, Guillaume Levarlet
Grand Prix Cristal Energie, Florian Morizot
2008
Paris–Mantes-en-Yvelines, Florian Morizot
Overall, Circuit de Lorraine, Steve Chainel
Stage 4, Steve Chainel
Overall Ronde de l'Oise, Niels Brouzes
Stage 4 Tour du Poitou-Charentes, Florian Morizot
Paris–Tours Espoirs, Tony Gallopin
2009
Stage 1 Tour de Normandie, Morgan Chedhomme
Stage 4 Tour de Normandie, Fabien Bacquet
Stage 4 Route du Sud, Johan Mombaerts
2010
Stage 2 Ronde de l'Oise, Nadir Haddou
2011
Stages 4 & 6 Tour de Normandie, Fabien Bacquet
Stage 5 Tour de Bretagne, Maxime Méderel
Overall Rhône-Alpes Isère Tour, Sylvain Georges
Stages 1 & 3, Sylvain Georges
Grand Prix de Plumelec-Morbihan, Sylvain Georges
2012
Stage 8 Tour de Normandie, Benoit Drujon
Stage 7 Tour de Bretagne, Dimitri Le Boulch
Stage 5 Circuit de Lorraine, Steven Tronet
2013
Les Boucles du Sud Ardèche, Mathieu Drujon
Stage 4 Tour du Limousin, Stéphane Rossetto
2014
 Road Race Championships, Alo Jakin
Grand Prix de la Ville de Lillers, Steven Tronet
Paris–Troyes, Steven Tronet
Overall Boucles de la Mayenne, Stéphane Rossetto
2015
Paris–Troyes, David Menut
Stage 2 Circuit des Ardennes, Steven Tronet
Boucles de l'Aulne, Alo Jakin
Stage 2 Ronde de l'Oise, Steven Tronet
Stage 1 Route du Sud, Steven Tronet
 Road Race Championships, Steven Tronet
2016
Stage 4 Circuit des Ardennes, Alo Jakin
2017
La Roue Tourangelle, Flavien Dassonville
Overall Tour de Bretagne, Flavien Dassonville
Stage 2, Flavien Dassonville
Overall Ronde de l'Oise, Flavien Dassonville
Stage 1, Flavien Dassonville
2018
Overall Circuit des Ardennes International, Anthony Maldonado
Boucles de l'Aulne, Kévin Le Cunff
Stage 2 Ronde de l'Oise, Damien Touzé
Overall Kreiz Breizh Elites, Damien Touzé
Stage 1, Damien Touzé
2019
Overall Ronde de l'Oise, Anthony Maldonado
Stage 2, Anthony Maldonado
2021
Paris–Troyes, Romain Cardis
Stage 2 Tour Poitou-Charentes en Nouvelle-Aquitaine, Jason Tesson
Overall À travers les Hauts-de-France, Jason Tesson
Stage 1, Jason Tesson

National champions

2000
 French Road Race Championships, Christophe Capelle
2001
 British Road Race Championships, Jeremy Hunt
2014
 Estonian Road Race Championships, Alo Jakin
2015
 French Road Race Championships, Steven Tronet

Achievements in Tour de France
Team classification
 1996:
 1997: 13th
 1998: 9th
 1999: 16th
 2001: 21st

Former riders
Ludovic Auger
Stéphane Barthe
William Bonnet
Christophe Capelle
Steve Chainel
Carlos Da Cruz
Mathieu Drujon
Said Haddou
Stéphane Heulot
Arnold Jeannesson
Arnaud Labbe
Pascal Lance
Guillaume Levarlet
Pascal Lino
Rene Mandri
Julien Mazet
Anthony Morin
John Nilsson
Cyril Saugrain
Tony Gallopin
Mathieu Drujon

See also
List of UCI professional continental and continental teams
1996 Tour de France
1997 Tour de France
1998 Tour de France
1999 Tour de France
2001 Tour de France

References

External links

UCI Continental Teams (Europe)
Cycling teams based in France
Cycling teams established in 1994